The 2021 Belgrade Open was a tournament on the 2021 ATP Tour. It was played on outdoor clay courts in Belgrade, Serbia. It was organised with a single-year licence in 2021, and was held at Novak Tennis Center from May 23 to 29, 2021.

Champions

Singles

  Novak Djokovic def.  Alex Molčan, 6–4, 6–3

Doubles

  Jonathan Erlich /  Andrei Vasilevski def.  André Göransson /  Rafael Matos, 6–4, 6–1

References

External links

2021 ATP Tour
Tennis tournaments in Serbia
May 2021 sports events in Serbia
2021 in Serbian sport